A leisure centre, sports centre, recreation center, or aquatics centre is a purpose-built building or site, usually owned and provided by the local government authority, where people can engage in a variety of sports and exercise, and keep fit.

Typical facilities 
Facilities typically include a swimming pool, a large sports hall, and a gym, and may include: aerobics studios, an indoor cycling studio, squash courts, a cafeteria, a licensed bar, outdoor grass and/or artificial pitches for football (soccer), hockey etc., a solarium, sauna and/or steam room. Some of its functions may overlap with that of a community centre. 

Leisure centres are staffed by attendants who carry out a range of tasks to help and supervise the people using the leisure centre's facilities, and act as swimming pool lifeguards, gym instructors and coaches, offering advice, motivation, and expertise to users. Leisure centres are often operated by private companies on contract to the local authority.

Some leisure centres, particularly in Australia, are called aquatic centres, if their main facilities are pools for swimming, diving, and other aquatic sports.

Examples of leisure centres 
Current
Deeside Leisure Centre
Leisure centres in Cardiff
Kensington Leisure Centre
South Norwood Leisure Centre
Splashpoint Leisure Centre in Worthing
Swansea Leisure Centre in Wales
The Dome Leisure Centre in Doncaster

Former
Gloucester Leisure Centre
Ladywell Leisure Centre in Lewisham, London

See also 
Department of Parks and Recreation (disambiguation)
Health club
Sports club

References

External links
The Sports Leisure Legacy Project (UK)

Physical exercise
Sports venues